Shen Deyong (born March 12, 1954) is a Chinese politician and judge who served as the chairperson of the Social and Legal Affairs Committee of the Chinese People's Political Consultative Conference (CPPCC). At the height of his political career, he served as executive vice-president of the Supreme People's Court, the highest level of court in China. Shen formally resigned from the government in June 2018, which was a shock to the news media.

He began work in December 1977 and joined the Chinese Communist Party (CCP) in May 1972. Shen was a member of the 18th and 19th CCP Central Committee. He was a delegate to the 19th National Congress of the Chinese Communist Party. He was also a member of the 16th and 17th Central Commission for Discipline Inspection of the Chinese Communist Party. He is a member of the 13th Standing Committee of the CPPCC.

Biography
Shen was born in Xiushui County, Jiangxi in March 1954. After high school in 1975, he studied, then taught, at what is now Jiangxi Normal University, where he majored in English. In September 1980, he was accepted to China University of Political Science and Law.

After graduating in 1983, Shen was assigned to Nanchang, capital of Jiangxi province, as an official in the Provincial Commission of Politics and Law. In September 1988 he was transferred to Jiangxi Higher People's Court, where he was vice-president between 1993 and 1997. He became the deputy secretary of Jiangxi Provincial Discipline Inspection Committee of the Chinese Communist Party in February 1997, and served until October 1998.

In October 1998, Shen was transferred to Beijing and he was promoted to become vice-president of the Supreme People's Court, the highest level of court in China. He was secretary of Shanghai Municipal Discipline Inspection Committee of the Chinese Communist Party in November 2006, and held that office until April 2008. Then he was promoted again to become executive vice-president of the Supreme People's Court, a position at ministerial level. He became chairperson of the Social and Legal Affairs Committee of the Chinese People's Political Consultative Conference (CPPCC) in March 2018, serving in the post until his formally resignation from office in June 2018. On June 22, 2018, he published a farewell article on the internet and teased himself as an old cadre.

Downfall
On March 21, 2022, he has been placed under investigation for "serious violations of discipline and laws" by the Central Commission for Discipline Inspection (CCDI), the CCP's internal disciplinary body, and the National Supervisory Commission, the highest anti-corruption agency of China. On September 7, he was expelled from the CCP.

References

External links

1954 births
Living people
Jiangxi Normal University alumni
China University of Political Science and Law alumni
Central Party School of the Chinese Communist Party alumni
People's Republic of China politicians from Jiangxi
Chinese Communist Party politicians from Jiangxi
Expelled members of the Chinese Communist Party
Politicians from Jiujiang